Federico Tontodonati (born 30 October 1989) is a male Italian racewalker who won six international medals at senior level at the race walk competitions. He competed at the 2020 Summer Olympics, in 20 km walk.

Biography
He competed in the 20 kilometres walk event at the 2015 World Championships in Athletics in Beijing, China, finishing at the 27th position. He won 9 national titles: 3 over 50 km (in 2011, 2012, 2015), 3 over 20 km (2012, 2016, 2021), two over 10 km (2015 and 2017) and one over 5000 m indoor (2021).

Tontodonati family
Tontodonati is a family of sportswomen and sportsmen. Federico is the brother of the kayaking coach Matteo Tontodonati (born 1991) and the nephew of the ex-Italian rower Letizia Tontodonati (born 1998), ex-brother-in-law of the Australian-born Italian rower Kiri Tontodonati (born 1994), ex-wife of Matteo, coach of the kayaker Marco Tontodonati (born 2005), and son of the rowing coach Mauro Tontodonati (born 1963).

National titles
Tontodonati won eight national championships at individual senior level.

Italian Athletics Championships
10,000 m walk tracks: 2017 (1)
10 km walk road: 2015 (1)
20 km walk road: 2012, 2016, 2021 (3)
50 km walk road: 2011, 2012, 2015 (3)
Italian Athletics Indoor Championships
5000 m walk tracks: 2021 (1)

See also
 Italy at the IAAF World Race Walking Cup
 Italy at the European Race Walking Cup

References

External links

Italian male racewalkers
Living people
1989 births
World Athletics Championships athletes for Italy
Athletics competitors of Centro Sportivo Aeronautica Militare
Sportspeople from Turin
Italian Athletics Championships winners
Athletes (track and field) at the 2020 Summer Olympics
Olympic athletes of Italy
21st-century Italian people